Peter Robert Hawes (30 September 1947 – 29 October 2018) was a New Zealand playwright, novelist, and scriptwriter.

Biography
Born in Westport, Hawes earned a Bachelor of Arts degree at the University of Canterbury, in Christchurch.

Whilst living in Barcelona, he wrote—in Spanish—a best-selling novel about the Spanish Inquisition: La Hoguera (The Bonfire), published in 1974. After returning to New Zealand in 1975, he worked for television, as a researcher and journalist, and as a scriptwriter for various series, including Fraggle Rock, and Against the Law.

Several of his plays remain unperformed; for example, A Higher Form of Killing.

Hawes died on 29 October 2018.

Selected works

Novels 
La Hoguera (in Spanish) (The Bonfire), 1974
Tasman's Lay, 1995
Leapfrog with Unicorns, 1996

Plays 
Alf's General Theory of Relativity, 1981
Ptolemy's Dip, 1982
Armageddon Revisited, 1983
Goldie: A Good Joke, a portrait of the early New Zealand painter C. F. Goldie, 1987
1946 The Boat Train, which examines the effect of the World War 2 on the lives of four women, 1991
Aunt Daisy, 1989
The 1944 Olympic Games, one-act play
A Higher Form of Killing, about physicist Ernest Rutherford
The Inquisition Dies, developed from material in La Hoguera

Other 
, a history of Centrepoint Theatre in Palmerston North

References

External links
 New Zealand Book Council
 Trove, National Library of Australia

1947 births
2018 deaths
People from Westport, New Zealand
University of Canterbury alumni
New Zealand male novelists